Amitabh Bachchan Falls (real name is Bhewma Falls) lies on the road connecting Chungthang to Yumthang Valley in Lachung, North Sikkim district of Sikkim. It has believed to have gotten the name Amitabh Bachchan Falls from the Bollywood star Amitabh Bachchan, who is very tall.

It is one of the tallest waterfalls shown to tourists by local tour operators and cab-drivers-cum-guides. Like most other waterfalls in Sikkim, there is much confusion with pictures shown by a random Google search.

External links
https://www.flickr.com/photos/d-40/5452492981/in/set-72157625947337063

References

Mangan district
Waterfalls of Sikkim
Tourist attractions in Sikkim
Amitabh Bachchan